Washington Township is an inactive township in Pettis County, in the U.S. state of Missouri.

Washington Township has the name of President George Washington.

References

Townships in Missouri
Townships in Pettis County, Missouri